The Olympic Club was a private club in 19th-century New Orleans best known for hosting boxing matches.

The venue
The club was organized in 1883.  With various expansions the Olympic  Club's complex of buildings grew to cover a whole city block in what is now called the Bywater section of New Orleans, at the intersection of Royal Street and Montegut Street.  It included a gymnasium and other facilities for members, as well as a large arena lit by electric lighting - still something of a novelty at the time. The original arena seated 3,500;  in response to growing success it was expanded to seat 10,000.

Events
While the club hosted a variety of events, including chess matches, it was by far best known for boxing matches. Sports writer S. Derby Gisclair called it "the epicenter of professional boxing" in the era. 

The most famous of boxing matches held at the Olympic Club were a series of World Championship matches held on consecutive days in September of 1892, including Featherweight and Lightweight championship matches, cumulating in  James J. Corbett defeating  John L. Sullivan for the World Heavyweight Championship.

On April 6, 1893, the longest fight in professional boxing history took place at the Olympic Club, as Andy Bowen fought Jack Burke for the Lightweight Championship. The match lasted 110 rounds, over seven hours and 19 minutes (each round lasting three minutes) before referee John Duffy declared a "no contest", both men having become too dazed and tired to come out of their corners.

End of the Olympic Club
The Olympic Club complex burned to the ground in 1897.

References
  1892: A gentleman, a brawler and the New Orleans fight that reinvented boxing New Orleans Times-Picayune
 Lords of the Ring - Boxing in New Orleans New Orleans Magazine   
 Crescent City Sports: The Olympic Club The Historic New Orleans Collection

Further reading
 The Olympic Club of New Orleans: Epicenter of Professional Boxing, 1883-1897 by S. Derby Gisclair, 2018 
 

Boxing venues in New Orleans
Defunct boxing venues in the United States
Defunct sports venues in New Orleans
Demolished sports venues in Louisiana